Marilyn Winder is a Canadian para-alpine skier. She represented Canada at the 1998 Winter Paralympics, where she won three medals: one silver medal and two bronze medals. She won the silver medal in the Women's Super-G B1,3 event and the bronze medals in the Women's Giant Slalom B1,3 and the Women's Slalom B1,3 events.

See also 
 List of Paralympic medalists in alpine skiing

References

External links 
 

Living people
Year of birth missing (living people)
Place of birth missing (living people)
Paralympic alpine skiers of Canada
Canadian female alpine skiers
Canadian amputees
Alpine skiers at the 1998 Winter Paralympics
Medalists at the 1998 Winter Paralympics
Paralympic silver medalists for Canada
Paralympic bronze medalists for Canada
Paralympic medalists in alpine skiing
20th-century Canadian women
21st-century Canadian women